Qarapirimli (also Karapirimli, Ghara'pirimli, and Karapirum) is a village in the Agdam Rayon of Azerbaijan.

References 

Populated places in Aghdam District